Jaroslav Vrábel (born 17 September 1971) is a retired Czech football defender.

References

1971 births
Living people
Czech footballers
FC Hradec Králové players
Bohemians 1905 players
Czech First League players
Association football defenders